The Ben's Cat Stakes is an American Thoroughbred horse race held annually in August at Laurel Park Racecourse in Laurel, Maryland. It is open to horses three years old and up and is raced on turf. For 2016, the distance is 6 furlongs. This race was formerly called the Mister Diz Stakes.

The race honors Ben's Cat, Maryland's four-time Horse of the Year that won 32 races, 26 stakes and more than $2.6 million in purse earnings from 63 starts in an eight-year career from 2010 to 2017. Ben's Cat was bred, owned and trained by Hall of Fame inductee King Leatherbury. Ben's Cat died at the age of 11 in July 2017, less than a month following his retirement. Ben's Cat actually won the race that would be renamed in his honor an unheard of six times.

The race was formerly named in honor of Mister Diz, who was bred and owned by former Pimlico Race Course Vice-president Nathan Cohen. Mister Diz was named Maryland-bred champion for four consecutive years from 1968 to 1971. He was the Champion two-year-old, three-year-old and champion older horse twice. He was also named Champion turf horse twice. Mister Diz, a foal of 1966, came from modest origins. He was a gelding out of Panacean and earned $387,015 over eight seasons. Mister Diz was named for track employee Frank Rosenfeld, who was nicknamed Mister Diz. The flashy chestnut gelding with four high white stockings and a blaze won nine stakes races and placed in 16 others. He set track records at Laurel Park for 7 furlongs and Monmouth Park at  miles.

Records
Speed record: 
 5.5 furlongs - 1:01.00 - Tommie's Star  (2007) 
 6 furlongs - 1:08.60 - My Problem  (2000)
 5 furlongs - 0:56.00 - Elberton  (2001)

Most wins by a horse
 6 - Ben's Cat (2010, 2011, 2012, 2013, 2014, 2015)

Most wins by a jockey:
 3 - Julian Pimentel (2013, 2014, 2015)

Most wins by a trainer:
 6 - King T. Leatherbury    (2010, 2011, 2012, 2013, 2014, 2015)
 3 - Michael Trombetta    (2002, 2003, 2006)

Winners

See also 

 Ben's Cat Stakes top three finishers

References

1983 establishments in Maryland
Laurel Park Racecourse
Horse races in Maryland
Recurring sporting events established in 1983